Pelospora is a Gram-negative strictly anaerobic and spore-forming bacterial genus from the family of Syntrophomonadaceae with one known species (Pelospora glutarica).

References

Eubacteriales
Bacteria genera
Monotypic bacteria genera